The Caverne du Pont-d'Arc, Chauvet 2, is a replica of the Chauvet Cave in the commune of Vallon-Pont-d'Arc, in the department of Ardèche and in the Rhône-Alpes region of France. Construction began in October 2012 and it was opened to the public in 2015.

Description

Access and Admission 
Visits to the replica of the cave are only possible in guided groups. Time-bound tickets are sold for this purpose. Groups of about 25 people are admitted at intervals and complete the guided tour in French, English, German or Dutch in about 50 minutes. Audio guides in 10 languages are available for visitors speaking other languages.

Visitors can enter all other facilities of the complex free of charge.

References

External links

Official site

Show caves in France
Buildings and structures in Ardèche
Tourist attractions in Ardèche